Willem Groeneveld (born 27 June 1990) is a Namibian cricketer. He is a right-handed batsman and right-arm off-break bowler.

Groeneveld made his first-class debut for the side during the 2009-10 CSA Provincial Three-Day Challenge, against Griqualand West in October 2009. In the first innings in which he batted, he scored 5 runs.

References

External links
Willem Groeneveld at Cricinfo

1990 births
Living people
Namibian cricketers